Emu Airways was an airline based in Adelaide in Australia operating tourist flights to nearby Kangaroo Island. It was part of the RegionalLink Airlines group which also included Airnorth and Airlines of South Australia (ASA).

Code data 

IATA Code: TL

History 

Emu Airways operated for close to 30 years and was previously owned by Emu Air Charter Pty Ltd. It was acquired in March 2004 by Darwin based aviation services company Capiteq Limited, as part of a major new coalition of regional air services in Australia, RegionalLink Airlines. This was considered Australia's first airline franchise operation. All of the participating airlines would continue to trade in their local markets under their own names, the logos of which were featured on the fuselages of aircraft within the group. However, Emu Airways and partner Airlines of South Australia ceased operations on 9 November 2005, citing the entry of QantasLink and other factors in their decision.

Services 

Adelaide to Kingscote (on Kangaroo Island)
As of April 1, 1979 EMU Airways also served Parndana and American River on Kangaroo Island.

Fleet 

The airline's fleet varied over thirty years of operation, and included various light passenger aircraft, including the Cessna 402.  As of the acquisition by Capiteq Limited, the fleet consisted of:

2 Raytheon Beech 1900C

See also
List of defunct airlines of Australia
 Aviation in Australia

References

External links

RegionalLink Airlines
Airnorth

Defunct airlines of Australia
Kangaroo Island
Airlines disestablished in 2005